Chill is a PlayStation snowboarding video game published by Eidos Interactive in 1998 and developed by Silicon Dreams Studio.

Gameplay
The game features five tracks spread over five mountains, and features a two-player multiplayer mode that can be played in either  vertical or horizontal split-screen mode.

Development
The game's existence was first mentioned in November 1996. The title was endorsed by Burton Boards of America and was showcased at E3 1997.

Eidos stated in early 1998 that they had decided against publishing the game for the PlayStation, but they nonetheless released it a few months later. A Sega Saturn version of the game was slated to be published by Sega Europe, and was completed in time for its planned release date of April 1998, but in the end it was left unreleased.

Reception

Cambridge Evening News gave the game a score of 3 out of 5 stating "But Overall the game is slightly dull and predictable. Chill will draw a cool response from snowboarding fans"

References

1998 video games
Cancelled Sega Saturn games
Eidos Interactive games
Europe-exclusive video games
PlayStation (console) games
PlayStation (console)-only games
Snowboarding video games
Video games developed in the United Kingdom